Igor Miović (born 31 March 1986 in Smederevo) is a Serbian football defender who is currently a free agent.

He previously played with FK Smederevo, FK Železničar Smederevo, INON Požarevac and Hong Kong First Division League club Sun Pegasus.

Club career

Sun Pegasus
On 11 January 2013, Miović joined Hong Kong First Division League club Sun Pegasus for an undisclosed fee.  Miović made his debut for Sun Pegasus on 2 February 2013 in a league match against South China, with the match ending 1–1.  He scored his first goal for Sun Pegasus on 16 February 2013 in a FA Cup clash against Tuen Mun – a campaign in which Sun Pegasus finished as runners-up.

On 14 September 2013, Miović netted a brace for the first time in his professional career in a thrilling 5–3 victory against South China.

Rangers
On 27 June 2017, Miovć signed with Rangers after a six month stint with Biu Chun Glory Sky.

Honours

Club
Happy Valley
Hong Kong First Division: 2018–19

Individual
Hong Kong First Division Team of the Year: 2013–14

References

External links
 
 Igor Miović stats at utakmica.rs 
 

1986 births
Living people
Sportspeople from Smederevo
Association football defenders
Serbian footballers
FK Smederevo players
FK Dinamo Vranje players
TSW Pegasus FC players
Hong Kong Rangers FC players
Happy Valley AA players
Serbian SuperLiga players
Serbian expatriate footballers
Hong Kong Premier League players
Hong Kong First Division League players
Expatriate footballers in Hong Kong
Serbian expatriate sportspeople in Hong Kong